SM UB-75 was a German Type UB III submarine or U-boat in the German Imperial Navy during World War I. She was commissioned into the German Imperial Navy on 11 September 1917 as SM UB-75.

 
UB-75 was serving in the Flanders Flotillas. On 10 December 1917 she was lost with all hands after hitting a mine.

Construction

She was built by AG Vulcan of Hamburg and following just under a year of construction, launched at Hamburg on 5 May 1917. UB-75 was commissioned later that same year . Like all Type UB III submarines, UB-75 carried 10 torpedoes and was armed with a  deck gun. UB-75 had a displacement of  while surfaced and  when submerged. Her engines enabled her to travel at  when surfaced and  when submerged.

Summary of raiding history

References

Notes

Citations

Bibliography

External links
 'UB-41 and UB-75, off Robin Hood's Bay: Marine Geophysical Survey report'
 England project to research First World War Submarine wrecks

German Type UB III submarines
World War I submarines of Germany
U-boats commissioned in 1917
1917 ships
Ships built in Hamburg
Maritime incidents in 1917
U-boats sunk in 1917
U-boats sunk by mines
World War I shipwrecks in the North Sea
Ships lost with all hands
Protected Wrecks of the United Kingdom